U.S. Route 33 (US 33) is part of the United States Numbered Highway System that runs from Richmond, Virginia, to Elkhart of the US state of Indiana. In Indiana, it is a state road that enters the state at the Ohio state line between Willshire, Ohio, and Pleasant Mills, Indiana. The  of US 33 that lie within Indiana serve as a major conduit. All of the highway is listed on the National Highway System. Various sections are rural two-lane highway, urbanized four-lane divided expressway and the Lincoln Highway. The northernmost community along the highway is Elkhart. The highway ends at an interchange in southern Elkhart after serving the northeastern region of Indiana. US 33 passes through farm fields and urban areas.

US 33 was first designated as a U.S. Highway in 1937. A section of the highway originally served as part of the Lincoln Highway, a connection between Fort Wayne and South Bend. US 41 replaced some the original State Road 2 (SR 2) designation of the highway which dated back to the formation of the Indiana State Road system. SR 2 ran from Illinois state line through South Bend to Elkhart and ended at the Ohio state line. Realignments and construction projects have expanded the highway to four lanes.

Route description
US 33 enters Indiana from Ohio heading northwest towards Decatur, as a rural two-lane highway, passing through farmland with a few houses. Along the way passing through a short concurrency with State Road 101 (SR 101), in Pleasant Mills. The highway enters Decatur by curving due west. The road begins a concurrency with US 27, heading due north as a four-lane highway with a center turn lane. The concurrency passes through mostly commercial before heading into downtown Decatur. In downtown Decatur the two routes have an intersection with US 224, this is the southern end of the US 224 concurrency. The three routes head north having an intersection at the northern end of the US 224 concurrency, US 224 turns due west. After the concurrency with US 224, US 27 and US 33 head north and then northwest towards Fort Wayne and the road becomes a four-lane divided highway. On the south side of Fort Wayne is a diamond interchange with Interstate 469 (I-469), this interchange is the north end of the concurrency with US 27.

US 33 heads west on I-469, which is concurrent with US 24. All three routes have an interchange with the northern terminus of the southern section of SR 1; this interchange has access to the Fort Wayne International Airport. After the interchange at SR 1, the interstate passes south of the airport. West of the airport is the terminus of I-469, both US 24 and US 33 turns north onto I-69, passing through rural areas with farmland as a four-lane interstate. Then, the interstate has an interchange with Airport Expressway/Lower Huntington Road. North of the Airport Expressway interchange, the roadway becomes a six-lane interstate, passing through urban areas with a mix of commercial and industrial properties. The highway enters the southwest side of Fort Wayne and US 24 leaves the concurrency, heading southwest. After the interchange with US 24, the interstate has an interchange with the eastern terminus SR 14, on the west side of Fort Wayne. After the interchange with SR 14, the highway turn northeast curving around Fort Wayne. On the northwest side of Fort Wayne, US 33 leaves I-69 heading northwest concurrent with US 30. The concurrency is a six-lane expressway, passing through woodlands with some commercial properties. Shortly after the concurrency with US 30 begins, it ends, with US 33 heading north and US 30 heading west. The highway becomes a four-lane highway with a center turn lane as it begins to leave Fort Wayne, passing through a mix of commercial and residential areas.

The roadway leaves Fort Wayne heading northwest as a two-lane mainly rural highway, passing through farmland with some woods. In Churubusco, the route has a traffic light with SR 205. Then the road heads towards Ligonier, passing through a four-stop intersection with SR 9 in Merriam. Then in Wolf Lake the road has an intersection with SR 109 at the main intersection in town. Then south of Ligonier the road passes through Kimmell and the route begins a concurrency with SR 5. The concurrency with SR 5 ends at the intersection with US 6 in Ligonier. Now the road heads towards Goshen passing through Benton on the way.

The road enters Goshen on the southeast side of the city as a two-lane highway with a center turn lane, passing commercial properties. As the road gets closer to downtown Goshen the road narrows to a two-lane street without turn lanes and passes Goshen High School. After the high school the road has a traffic light with the old alignment of US 33, before curving northwest and parallel to the Norfolk Southern Chicago Line. While parallel to the rail tracks US 33 is a limited access roadway and passes over another rail track. The road and rail tacks separate as they enter downtown Goshen. US 33 enters downtown Goshen on Pike Street as a four-lane city street and has a traffic light at SR 15. The route leaves downtown Goshen as a four-lane undivided highway, passing through a commercial district and residential area. After crossing the Elkhart River the highway widens to a four-lane highway with a center turn lane. The route heads towards Elkhart, paralleling the Norfolk Southern railroad and passing through Midway and Dunlap. On the south side of Elkhart, US 33 has an interchange with US 20; this interchange is the northern terminus for US 33.

The entire length of US 33 in Indiana is included as a part of the National Highway System (NHS). The NHS is a network of highways that are identified as being most important for the economy, mobility and defense of the nation. The highway is maintained by the Indiana Department of Transportation (INDOT) like all other U.S. Highways in the state. The department tracks the traffic volumes along all state highways as a part of its maintenance responsibilities using a metric called average annual daily traffic (AADT). This measurement is a calculation of the traffic level along a segment of roadway for any average day of the year. In 2010, INDOT figured that lowest traffic levels were 3,290 vehicles and 650 commercial vehicles used the highway daily at the Noble-Whitley County area. The peak traffic volumes were 79,520 vehicles and 11,060 commercial vehicles AADT along the section of US 33 at is concurrent with I-69, between the SR 14 and US 30 exits in Fort Wayne.

History

The Lincoln Highway was planned from Illinois state line to South Bend to Fort Wayne and the Ohio state line in 1913. In 1915, the highway opened and passed through downtown Fort Wayne on its route through Indiana. In 1917, Main Market route number 2 was the given number to the Lincoln Highway in Indiana. In the early 1920s, the Lincoln Highway was moved farther south between Valparaiso and Fort Wayne, to what is now known mostly as Old US 30, passing through Plymouth and Warsaw. The route became SR 2 from Ohio state line to South Bend, SR 1 from South Bend to Michigan state line. Then in 1924, the sections of the road that was part of the original Lincoln Highway was paved. The next few years the rest of the route was paved across Indiana, then in 1937 US 33 was created.

In 1998, INDOT rerouted most of its maintained routes onto interstate highways around Fort Wayne, so US 33 was routed onto I-469 and I-69 around the south side of the city. In the same year, INDOT removed US 33 north of US 20 and the St. Joseph County portion became SR 933. In 2004, INDOT tried to return SR 933 to the local communities but they did not accept.

In 2018 a new alignment of US 33 bypassing downtown Goshen to the northeast opened.

Major intersections

See also

References

External links

Indiana Highway Ends: US 33

33
Transportation in Fort Wayne, Indiana
 
Transportation in Elkhart, Indiana
Transportation in Adams County, Indiana
Transportation in Allen County, Indiana
Transportation in Whitley County, Indiana
Transportation in Noble County, Indiana
Transportation in Elkhart County, Indiana
U.S. Route 033 in Indiana